Deretrachys is a genus of beetles in the family Cerambycidae, containing the following species:

 Deretrachys chilensis (Bosq, 1949)
 Deretrachys juvencus (Dupont, 1840)
 Deretrachys montanus (Tippmann, 1953)
 Deretrachys pellitus (Kirsch, 1889)
 Deretrachys villiersi Huedepohl, 1985

References

Trachyderini
Cerambycidae genera